Megat Amir Faisal Al Khalidi bin Ibrahim (born 27 September 1978) is a Malaysian footballer who is a former football player and now he is a professional coach. He has coached Harimau Muda U23 and Malaysia Team U23 to national level in 2015 and 2016. He has also coached Felcra and Kedah. He is the current First Team Goalkeeper Coach for PJ City FC. He holds AFC Goalkeeping Coaching Certificate Level 3. His preferred playing position is as a goalkeeper.

Career
The Penang-born goalkeeper began his career with Penang youth team and later picked as one of the national Olympic 2000 team goalkeeper playing in M-League for 1999 season. After his national team stint ended, he returned to Penang and become the understudy of the main goalkeeper Zamri Mat Ariff. After Zamri departure to Perak, he was given a nod as main senior team goalkeeper until he signed with Kedah in 2005. He became a cult figure with Kedah due to his performances with them.

Other club noticed his performances with Kedah, leading to Megat joining Selangor for a two-season contract in 2006. He was released by Selangor with a few other senior players in a clean out following a very poor season for Selangor in 2008.

He had trial with Perak FA and later signed with them after Perak FA lost two of their experienced goalkeepers, Mohd Hamsani Ahmad and Mohd Nasril Nourdin to Selangor for 2009 season. After being released from Perak, he returned to his hometown to join Penang FA for Malaysia Premier League 2011 season.

In 2012, he joined another Penang outfit PBAPP FC who plays in the 2012 Malaysia FAM League for the first time.

Megat was part of the Malaysia squad at the 1997 FIFA World Youth Championship in Malaysia. He also participated at the 2004 Malaysia Cup where his team lost 1–0.

Honours

Penang FA
 Malaysia Premier 1 League: 1998, 2001
 Malaysia FA Cup: 2002
 Malaysia Charity Shield: 2003

Kedah FA
 Malaysia Premier League: 2005-06

References

External links
Biodata at selangorfc.com 

1978 births
Malaysian footballers
Malaysia international footballers
Living people
People from Penang
Penang F.C. players
Selangor FA players
Perak F.C. players
Kedah Darul Aman F.C. players
Malaysia Super League players
Association football goalkeepers